Reynoutria multiflora (syn. Fallopia multiflora and Polygonum multiflorum) is a species of flowering plant in the buckwheat family Polygonaceae native to central and southern China. It is known by the English common names tuber fleeceflower and Chinese (climbing) knotweed. It is known as he shou wu in China and East Asia. Another name for the species is fo-ti, which is a misnomer. The name he shou wu means 'the black-haired Mr. He'.

It can be difficult to prevent the spread of this vining plant and to remove it once established. The leaves are thin and fragile but the stems, although narrow in diameter, can be very strong.

Description

Traditional medicine

Reynoutria multiflora is listed in the Chinese Pharmacopoeia and is one of the most popular perennial traditional Chinese medicines. Caution must be taken, however, as overconsumption can lead to toxicity-induced hepatitis.

Chemistry
More than 100 chemical compounds have been isolated from Reynoutria multiflora, and the major components have been determined to be stilbenes, quinones, flavonoids, and others.  Its extract contains a stilbene glycoside.

See also 

 Japanese knotweed

References

External links
line drawing, Flora of China Illustrations vol. 5, fig. 259, 3-5 

Polygonoideae
Flora of China
Medicinal plants
Plants described in 1784